"Come On" is a song recorded by Christine Anu. It was released as the fourth and final single from her debut studio album, Stylin' Up (1995). The song peaked at number 94 in Australia on the ARIA Charts.

At the ARIA Music Awards of 1996 the song won two of three awards for which it was nominated. It won the ARIA Award for Best Female Artist and Best Indigenous Release (for the second consecutive year), but lost Best Pop Release to Nick Cave and Kylie Minogue's "Where the Wild Roses Grow".

Track listings
CD single (D 1198)
 "Come On"	
 "Keep Up"	
 "Last Train" (Paul Kelly and Christine Anu) [Live at ABC Studios 23 July 1995]

Chart positions

References

1994 songs
1995 singles
Mushroom Records singles
Christine Anu songs
ARIA Award winners
Songs written by David Bridie
Songs written by Christine Anu